Al-Jumuʿah ("Friday") is the 62nd chapter (sūrah) of the Quran, with 11 verses (āyāt). The chapter is named al-jumu`ah ("Friday") because it is the day of assembly, when the community abandons trade, transactions, and other diversions in favor of assembling to seek the all-encompassing truth and most beneficent and seek the "bounty of God" exclusively (Verse 9). This surah is an Al-Musabbihat surah because it begins with the glorification of God.

Summary
1-4 A wise, powerful, and holy God sent Muhammad as his apostle to the Arabians
5-8 The Jews rebuked for their opposition to Islam 
9-11 Admonition concerning the observance of worship on Friday

Hadith about Surah Al-Jumua
The first and foremost exegesis/tafsir of the Qur'an is found in hadith of Muhammad. Although some scholars, including ibn Taymiyyah, claim that Muhammad has commented on the whole of the Qur'an, others including Ghazali cite the limited amount of narratives, thus indicating that he has commented only on a portion of the Qur'an. Ḥadīth (حديث) is literally "speech" or "report", that is a recorded saying or tradition of Muhammad validated by isnad; with Sirah Rasul Allah these comprise the sunnah and reveal shariah. According to Aishah, the life of Muhammad was a practical implementation of Qur'an. Therefore, mention in hadith elevates the importance of the pertinent surah from a certain perspective.

 In the Friday prayer he (Muhammad) would recite Surah Al-Jumua and Surah Al-Munafiqun (63).

 Al-Dahhak b. Qais asked al-Nu'man b. Bashir: What did the Messenger of Allah  recite on Friday after reciting the Surah Al-Jumua. He replied: He used to recite, "Had the story of overwhelming event reached you?" (Al-Ghashiyah (88)).

 Ibn Abi Rafi' said: Abu Hurairah led us in the Friday prayer and recited Surah Al-Jumua and "When the hypocrites come to you" (Al-Munafiqun 63) in the last rak'ah. He said: I met Abu Hurairah when he finished the prayer and said to him: You recited the two surah that Ali ibn Abi Talib used to recite at Kufa. Abu Hurairah said: I heard the Messenger of Allah reciting them on Friday.

References

External links
Quran Surah Al-Jumu'a

Jumua
Friday
Quran